is a Japanese voice actress. She retired from voice acting in 2002.

Anime voice acting credits

Original Video Animation
Gunbuster (Linda Yamamoto)
Pocket Monsters: Mewtwo Strikes Back! (Joy)

Television
Alice SOS
Mobile Suit Victory Gundam (Marvette Fingerhaut)
Psychic Force (OAV)
New Maple Town Story (Lamb)
Pokémon (Joy (first voice))
Sailor Moon (Mika Kayama (ep 18))

References

External links

1963 births
Living people
Japanese voice actresses